Bolma pseudobathyraphis is a species of sea snail, a marine gastropod mollusk in the family Turbinidae, the turban snails.

Description
The size of the shell varies between 28 mm and 42 mm.

Distribution
This marine species was found off the Norfolk Ridge, New Caledonia

References

External links
 To Encyclopedia of Life
 To World Register of Marine Species
 

pseudobathyraphis
Gastropods described in 2010